Brunilde Sismondo Ridgway (born 1929 in Chieti) is an Italian  archaeologist and specialist in ancient Greek sculpture.

Life
The daughter of an Italian officer, she spent her childhood in Ethiopia and Eritrea, where her father was stationed. After World War II, she studied classics at the University of Messina, where she obtained her degree in classics in 1953. An archaeology scholarship  and Fulbright Travel Grant allowed her to continue her studies at Bryn Mawr College in Pennsylvania, where she came under the tutelage of Rhys Carpenter. At the end of her MA, she wrote her thesis on Archaic sculpture at the American School of Classical Studies at Athens. She received her Ph.D in 1958 and returned as a teacher to Bryn Mawr, where she spent most of her career. In 1977 she was named Rhys Carpenter Professor of Classical and Near Eastern Archaeology, which she held until her retirement in 1994. In 1988 she won the Gold Medal of the Archaeological Institute of America. She was elected to the American Philosophical Society in 1993. She married physical therapist Henry W. Ridgway in 1958.

Views and opinions
Brunilde Ridgway is, in keeping with her mentor Rhys Carpenter, a follower of the radical questioning of the Meisterforschung, or search for the masterpiece or archetype that inspired a replica series, that dominated the history of Greek art since Adolf Furtwängler. Elaborating on Carpenter's remark that Greek sculpture is “the anonymous product of an impersonal craft,” she maintains that the notion of the artistic personality doesn't emerge in the West before the 15th century AD. She also addresses the Kopienforschung ("copy research") of Johann Joachim Winckelmann, who is finding a type statuary through its Roman copies, focusing on identifying the originality of Roman sculptors. Rather sceptical vis-à-vis the literary sources, she sticks to the stylistic analysis of the works.

Known for the safety of her erudition and for the stimulating quality of its analyses, it has been criticized, like Carpenter, for what was described as a "devastating" or "systematic scepticism”, or revisionism.

Selected writings
Her main works and writings are:
 Severe Style in Greek Sculpture, Princeton University Press, 1970.
 "The Aphrodite of Arles", in American Journal of Archæology, vol. 80, No. 2 (Spring 1976), pp. 147–154.
 The Archaic Style in Greek Sculpture, Princeton University Press, 1977 (revised and expanded edition in 1993).
 Fifth Century Styles in Greek Sculpture, Princeton University Press, 1981.
 Roman copies of Greek Sculpture: The Problem of the Originals,The Jerome Lectures University of Michigan Press, 1984
 "The State of Research in Ancient Art" in Art Bulletin, LXVIII (1986), pp. 8–23.
 Hellenistic Sculpture I: The Styles of ca. 331-200 BC, University of Wisconsin Press, 1990
 Fourth-Century Styles in Greek Sculpture, University of Wisconsin Press, 1997.
 "Prayers in Stone: Greek Architectural Sculpture (c. 600-100 B.C.E) " (the Sather 	Lectures 1996, vol. 63) (U. of CA Press, 1999)
 Hellenistic Sculpture II: The Styles of ca. 200-100 BC, University of Wisconsin Press, 2000
 Hellenistic Sculpture III: The Styles of ca 100-31 BC, University of Wisconsin Press, 2002
 Second Chance: Greek Revisited Sculptural Studies, University of Wisconsin Press, Pindar Press, 2004.

Notes

External links
 Brunilde S. Ridgway, Dictionary of Art Historians

1929 births
Living people
People from Chieti
Italian art historians
Bryn Mawr College alumni
Bryn Mawr College faculty
Classical archaeologists
Classical scholars of Bryn Mawr College
University of Messina alumni
Italian women archaeologists
Members of the American Philosophical Society